Steven Westra (born August 8, 1969) is an American politician and a Republican member of the South Dakota House of Representatives representing District 13 since January 11, 2013.

Education
Westra earned his BS from the University of South Dakota.

Elections
2012 When incumbent Representatives Democrat Susy Blake and Republican Brian Liss left the Legislature and left both the District 13 seats open, Westra ran in the three-way June 5, 2012 Republican Primary and placed second with 984 votes; Westra and fellow Republican nominee Mark Mickelson were unopposed for the November 6, 2012 General election, where Mickelson took the first seat and Westra took the second seat with 5,145 votes (41.94%).

References

External links
Official page at the South Dakota Legislature
Campaign site
 

Living people
Republican Party members of the South Dakota House of Representatives
Politicians from Sioux Falls, South Dakota
University of South Dakota alumni
1969 births
21st-century American politicians